Poundmaker Trail is a  interprovincial highway in Western Canada that runs from Edmonton, Alberta, to North Battleford, Saskatchewan, following Alberta Highway 14 and Saskatchewan Highway 40. The highway is named after Pitikwahanapiwiyin (c. 1842–July 4, 1886), commonly known as Poundmaker, a Plains Cree chief known as a peacemaker and defender of his people.

The former alignment of Poundmaker Trail followed Saskatchewan Highway 16A through Battleford and across the North Saskatchewan River along original Battlefords Bridge via Finlayson Island.  Around 2003, in conjunction with the Battlefords Bridge being twinned along the Highway 4/16/40 corridor, the original bridges were closed to motor vehicles, and Highway 16A was decommissioned.

Junction list
Alberta
  southeast of Edmonton
  southeast of Sherwood Park
  in Viking
  in Wainwright
  south of Lloydminster
Saskatchewan
  east of Cut Knife
  east of Battleford
  in Battleford

See also
 Yellowhead Highway

References

Alberta provincial highways, 1–216 series
Saskatchewan provincial highways
Transport in Edmonton